Zhangjiajie West railway station is a railway station in Yongding District, Zhangjiajie, Hunan, China. The station is an intermediate stop on the Qianjiang–Changde railway and the northern terminus of the Zhangjiajie–Jishou–Huaihua high-speed railway. It opened with the Qianjiang–Changde line on 26 December 2019.

The station has multiple large pieces of artwork inside.

References 

Railway stations in Hunan
Railway stations in China opened in 2019